St Bernard's Catholic High School is a coeducational Roman Catholic secondary school located in Furness, and is situated on Rating Lane in Barrow-in-Furness, Cumbria, England.

It was established in 1979, when the introduction of comprehensive education in the town resulted in a merger between the former St. Aloysius School (1953) and the Girls' Convent School (otherwise known as 'Our Lady's School', which had been operated by the nuns from Croslands Convent since 1929). It was officially established as a 'Specialist Science' School in 2006. The head teacher was Mr Eugene Tumelty who had been there for thirty years. He retired at the end of the 2010-2011 School Year. Mr Tumelty received the Benemerenti Medal for his religious teachings in the school. The headteacher is currently Mr P Croft.

Previously a voluntary aided school administered by Cumbria County Council, in September 2021 St Bernard's Catholic High School converted to academy status. It is now sponsored by the Mater Christi Multi Academy Trust, and continues to be under the jurisdiction of the Roman Catholic Diocese of Lancaster.

References

External links
 School website

Schools in Barrow-in-Furness
Secondary schools in Cumbria
Catholic secondary schools in the Diocese of Lancaster
Academies in Cumbria